"Love Survive" is a Japanese-language song, and the eleventh major single (14th overall) released, by Japanese pop rock band Scandal. The song begins "Harii harii aseru koigokoro / Surourii surourii kimi wo matsu jikan".

The first press edition came with a special booklet and a button badge limited to select shops. A sticker featuring a single member was also given to purchasers from Tower Records, HMV, Tsutaya, and Shinseido. The single reached #11 on the Oricon weekly chart and charted for four weeks, selling 17,250 copies.

Track listing

References 

2011 singles
Scandal (Japanese band) songs